WLOI is an AM radio station broadcasting on the frequency of 1540 kHz and licensed to the city of La Porte, Indiana.  WLOI broadcasts during daylight hours only; 1540 AM is a United States clear-channel frequency.  KXEL is the dominant Class A station on this frequency.

WLOI is owned by Spoon River Media, LLC and broadcasts a classic rock format.

On May 8, 2019, WLOI changed their format from adult standards to classic rock, to be branded as "Rock 106.5" in anticipation of signing on FM translator W293DR 106.5 FM La Porte.

FM Translator
WLOI relays programming to an FM translator; this allows the format to broadcast 24 hours per day, in addition to giving the listener high fidelity stereophonic sound.  Geographically, the translator is located between WXNU in St. Anne, Illinois and WVFM in Kalamazoo, Michigan.

References

External links

LOI
Classic rock radio stations in the United States
Radio stations established in 1948
1948 establishments in Indiana